Spálené Poříčí is a town in Plzeň-South District in the Plzeň Region of the Czech Republic. It has about 2,900 inhabitants. The historic town centre is well preserved and is protected by law as an urban monument zone.

Administrative parts
Villages of Číčov, Hořehledy, Hořice, Karlov, Lipnice, Lučiště, Struhaře, Těnovice, Vlkov and Záluží are administrative parts of Spálené Poříčí.

Etymology
The name Poříčí means "riverbed". In the 17th century, the adjective spálené (i.e. "burnt") town was added to the name because of many large fires that damaged the town.

Geography
It lies mostly in the Švihov Highlands. The Bradava Stream flows through the town. There are several ponds around the town, the largest of them are Hvížďalka and Vlkovský.

History
The first written mention of Poříčí is from 1239. It was then a market village, sold to the monastery in Kladruby. In 1360 at least, the village was purchased by Bohuslav of Schwamberg. They turned the village into a market town with a church and probably a fortress, but in 1391 Poříčí was sold again. Then the owners often changed. In the 16th century, Poříčí was promoted to a town.

In 1603, the estate was acquired by the Wratislaw of Mitrovice family. Adam the Elder Wratislaw of Mitrovice had the fortress rebuilt into a Renaissance castle in 1617. In 1620, during the Thirty Years' War, Poříčí was burned by the army of Charles Bonaventure Bucquoy. The town then again suffered from the passage of the army in 1645 and began to be called Spálené Poříčí. After the war, Jews were invited into the town to raise its economy.

In 1749, the Metropolitan Chapter at Saint Vitus in Prague bought the Spálené Poříčí. The town remained in its possession until modern times, and the chapter still owns the castle today.

Demographics

Sights

The Spálené Poříčí Castle replaced the original Gothic fortress in 1617. The Renaissance sgraffito decoration of the courtyard and two unique sandstone portals have been preserved. The castle is partly open to the public.

The Church of Saint Nicolas was originally built in the 14th century. It was rebuilt several times, its current look is from 1882.

Twin towns – sister cities

Spálené Poříčí is twinned with:
 Ralbitz-Rosenthal, Germany

References

External links

Cities and towns in the Czech Republic
Populated places in Plzeň-South District